Aleksa Đurašević Crnojević (1413–27), known as Lješ (Љеш) was the lord of Paštrovići (a coastal tribe) of the Lordship of Zeta and a voivode of the Serbian Despotate, alongside his older brother Đurađ.

Đurađ and his brother Aleksa (Lješ) were lords of the territory of Paštrovići (Luštica and hills above Kotor and Budva) during the reign of Balša III. The Đurašević family was a branch of the Kalođurđević family. Its members held the most distinct positions in the court of Balša III.

After the death of Balša III they refused Venetian invitations to switch sides and to accept Venetian suzerainty remaining loyal to new lord of Zeta, Serbian Despot Stefan Lazarević. They controlled 10 salt ponds in Grbalj valley near Kotor. Đurađ and his brother Aleksa built the Kom Monastery in the period between 1415 and 1427, when Upper Zeta was held by the Crnojevići.

On 10 March 1420 Venetians promised to appoint Đurađ and his brother Aleksa (Lješ) as governors of Budva.

References

Sources 
 
 

15th-century Serbian nobility
Lords of Zeta
Crnojević noble family
People of the Serbian Despotate
15th-century deaths
Bay of Kotor
Year of birth unknown